T Sports, also referred to as Titas Sports, is a Bangladeshi Bengali-language sports oriented television channel owned by East West Media Group, a subsidiary of Bashundhara Group. It is Bangladesh's first television channel dedicated to sports programming. In addition, T Sports added a high definition channel called T Sports HD which was launched on 9 January 2021.

History
T Sports began broadcasting in late 2020, started with a televised match between Bangladesh and Nepal on 9 November 2020. On the same day, it was announced that they would broadcast the Bangabandhu T20 Cup, a five-team Twenty20 cricket competition in Bangladesh. Later, on 10 January 2021, they added a HD Channel called "T Sports HD". In August 2022, T Sports gained the rights of airing the 2022 FIFA World Cup to Bangladeshi audiences.

Football Broadcasting Rights

Cricket Broadcasting Rights

Other Broadcasting Rights

Kabaddi

Volleyball

Weightlifting

Boxing

Hockey

3×3 Basketball

Badminton

Kickboxing

Tennis

Multi-Sports Events

Other sports

Sports-related shows

See also

 List of television stations in Bangladesh
 News24 (owned by Bashundhara Group)

References

External links
 
 
 

Television in Bangladesh
Sports television networks
Television channels and stations established in 2020
Television channels in Bangladesh